The Col du Parpaillon is a pass in the Cottian Alps of southern France in the Parpaillon massif. It connects La Condamine-Châtelard, the Ubaye Valley in Alpes-de-Haute-Provence department with Crévoux, Embrun in Hautes-Alpes.

It was built by the French Army starting in 1891, with work on the road and tunnel lasting until 1911, although  the tunnel was completed in 1901. It is closed at either end with metal doors. The approach road is not paved and is closed in winter. The curved tunnel is among the highest in Europe.

The location was considered a strategic point as early as the 18th century.  From 1692 to 1694, work proceeded on a military road suitable for artillery, at the urging of General d'Usson. The 19th century military road connects the Fort de Tournoux complex of fortifications to Embrun and points north.

Luc Moullet's 1992 film Parpaillon describes a bicycle journey over the pass.


See also
 List of highest paved roads in Europe
 List of mountain passes

References

External links
 Cycling the Route du Parpaillon, Vallée del'Ubaye at www.mountainpassions.com
 Parpaillon (tunnel du) at fortiff.be 

Road tunnels in France
Mountain passes of the Alps